Shri Shani Dham Temple is a Hindu temple God Shani Dev. It is located in Asola - a suburb of Indian capital and city-territory Delhi.

History 
On 31 May 2003 a large Shani Idol made of rock, the largest in the world, was unveiled. It has become an attraction for devotees of Lord Shani.

In 2018 the temple came under scrutiny for their affiliation with Daati Maharaj, who had been accused of sexual assault.

In 2020 the temple held religious gatherings in violation of local social distancing rules related to the COVID-19 pandemic.

Description 

The temple's primary deity is Shani and it is divided into two parts: eastern and western. The temple also has a library and a research center. Near the main gate, there is an inquiry office, reception office and the publication department.

The eastern part is home to the large Shani idol and idols of the twelve 'Jyotirlings'. 

In the western part there are large Shani statues erected over the buffalo and the vulture. To the right of these statues is an idol of Hanuman. The western section also contains an oblation pool and idols of the nine planets.

References

External links

 Official website

Hindu temples in Delhi